

3rd millennium

21st century 
List of current sovereign states

Sovereign states by decade:

2nd millennium by century

20th century
Sovereign states by decade:

19th century

List of political entities in the 19th century
Sovereign states by decade:

18th century

Sovereign states by year:

17th century
Sovereign states by year:

16th century
Sovereign states by year:

15th century
Sovereign states by year:

11th century
List of political entities in the 11th century

1st millennium by century
List of political entities in the 10th century
List of political entities in the 9th century
List of political entities in the 8th century
List of political entities in the 7th century
List of political entities in the 6th century
List of political entities in the 5th century
List of political entities in the 4th century
List of political entities in the 3rd century
List of political entities in the 2nd century
List of political entities in the 1st century

1st millennium BC by century
List of political entities in the 1st century BC
List of political entities in the 2nd century BC
List of political entities in the 3rd century BC
List of political entities in the 4th century BC
List of political entities in the 5th century BC
List of political entities in the 6th century BC
List of political entities in the 7th century BC
List of political entities in the 8th century BC
List of political entities in the 9th century BC
List of political entities in the 10th century BC

2nd millennium BC by century
List of political entities in the 11th century BC
List of political entities in the 12th century BC
List of political entities in the 13th century BC
List of political entities in the 14th century BC
List of political entities in the 15th century BC
List of political entities in the 16th century BC
List of political entities in the 17th century BC
List of political entities in the 18th century BC
List of political entities in the 19th century BC
List of political entities in the 20th century BC

3rd and 4th millennium BC by century
List of political entities in the 21st century BC
List of political entities in the 35th century BC

Pre-modern polities by age

List of states during the Middle Ages
List of medieval great powers
List of Classical Age states
List of states during Late Antiquity
List of Iron Age states
List of Bronze Age states
List of cities of the ancient Near East

 
Lists of years by topic